GE Appliances is an American home appliance manufacturer based in Louisville, Kentucky. It has been majority owned by Chinese multinational home appliances company Haier since 2016. It is one of the largest appliance companies in the United States and manufactures appliances under several brands, including GE, GE Profile, Café, Monogram, Haier and Hotpoint (Americas only, European rights held by Whirlpool Corporation). The company also owns FirstBuild, a co-creation community and micro-factory on the University of Louisville's campus in Louisville, Kentucky. Another FirstBuild location is in South Korea, and a FirstBuild location in India opened its doors in 2019.

The company was owned by General Electric until 2016, and it was previously known as GE Appliances & Lighting and GE Consumer & Industrial. Haier has the right to use the GE brand name until 2056.

History
GE Appliances was originally a part of General Electric, a company which began marketing a full roster of heating and cooking products in 1907.  In January 2004, it became part of GE Consumer & Industrial when GE Consumer Products (founded in 1905) merged with GE Industrial Systems (founded in 1930) to form GE Consumer & Industrial. From 2010 to late 2014, GE Appliances & Lighting was a sub-business under GE Home & Business Solutions.

On September 8, 2014, General Electric agreed to sell the company to Electrolux, a Swedish appliance manufacturer and the second-largest consumer appliance manufacturer after Whirlpool Corporation, for US$3.3 billion in cash. The deal carried a US$175 million termination fee clause if Electrolux was unable to complete the acquisition. The transaction was terminated in December 2015 after the United States Department of Justice filed a lawsuit to block the deal on concerns that, along with Whirlpool, the combined company would control 90% of the "do-it-yourself" market for kitchen appliances sold by home construction retailers.

On June 6, 2016, Haier and KKR acquired GE Appliances for $5.6 billion. Under the terms of the sale, Haier would have the right to use the GE brand name until 2056. GE Appliances launched a refreshed tagline (“good things, for life”) in 2017, a nod to its history with General Electric, which used the tagline “we bring good things to life” from 1979 to 2003.

GE appliances now operates as an independent subsidiary and remains headquartered in Louisville, Kentucky.

GE Appliance Park
In 1951, construction began in Louisville, Kentucky on Appliance Park, the now 750-acre (300-ha) manufacturing facility that employs 8,100 people. In 2007, the  Monogram Experience Center opened to provide architects, designers, contractors, and other home-industry professionals the opportunity to interact with appliances from the Monogram Collection. In 2011, a data center with platinum certification by Leadership in Energy and Environmental Design was opened. Building 6 was destroyed by an 8-alarm fire on the morning of April 3, 2015. In 2017, the company invested $30 million to construct a new washer and dryer manufacturing line. In 2017, the company moved the Supplier Distribution Center operated by Derby Supply Chain Solutions to AP2. In 2018, the company announced a $200 million investment in its laundry and dishwasher product facilities.

2015 fire
A "mammoth" fire occurred on the morning of April 3, 2015 at the Appliance Park. Building 6 (AP6) partially collapsed and was predicted to be a total loss. The 6-acre (24,000 m2) building, located at 4000 Buechel Bank Road, was mostly being used for storage, with portions leased to GE suppliers and logistics partners. More than 200 firefighters from 18 local agencies were involved in fighting the eight-alarm fire, which led to a production halt and evacuation of the other buildings in the complex. No injuries or fatalities were reported, but "shelter in place" orders were issued for homes and businesses within a 2-mile (3.2 km) radius (later reduced to a one-half mile radius) of the Appliance Park due to noxious and acrid smoke. No hazardous materials were known to be stored at the site. Because of the huge volume of smoke, gases and runoff from burning plastics and other materials the Kentucky Department of Environmental Protection and USEPA were called in to monitor emissions from the fire and found they were not toxic. However, area residents reported leaf-size pieces of ash and burned insulation materials in their yards. The cause of the fire remained unclear; a local fire chief said that investigators were leaning toward a lightning strike as the probable cause.

The fire was contained, but not extinguished, by the early afternoon of April 3. A statement issued by GE later that day indicated that production at the complex would remain halted over the weekend and at least through the end of the following week as the company conducted "a thorough evaluation of all other buildings" and replenished inventories of parts destroyed by the fire. The shelter-in-place order was canceled for residents within one-half mile of the site the following Sunday, April 5.

Two years following the fire, an employee-led company initiative turned the site into a sustainable green space that contains native grasses, trees, and wildlife.

Manufacturing facilities 
GE Appliances’ largest manufacturing site, Appliance Park facility in Louisville, Kentucky, produces washing machines, dryers, dishwashers, and bottom-freezer refrigerators. The company also operates manufacturing sites in four states including Decatur, Alabama – which produces top freezer refrigerators; LaFayette, Georgia – cooking products; Selmer, Tennessee – Monogram built-in refrigerators and Zoneline PTACs, and Camden, South Carolina – refrigeration products. The facilities in LaFayette and Selmer are wholly owned subsidiaries of GE Appliances.

In 2018, the company announced it would make major investments in its U.S. facilities including $200 million into Appliance Park in Louisville, $150 million investment in new distribution centers in Dallas, Denver, Northern Georgia, Northern California, and $115 million in its manufacturing facility in Decatur, Alabama.

Innovation and technology 
GE Appliances has a long history of cooking innovation and is responsible for creating the first self-cleaning oven as well as the first over-the-range microwave. GE Appliances was also the first manufacturer to launch a suite of WiFi-connected appliances as well as the first suite of appliances that work with IFTTT. As voice assistants became more common, GE Appliances became the first U.S. manufacturer to have its appliances work with Amazon Echo (2017) and Google Home (2017). The company's efforts in the connected space earned it the title of “Smart Appliance Company of the Year” in the 2019 IoT Breakthrough Awards Program.

See also
 List of major employers in Louisville, Kentucky

References

External links
 
 Appliance Park: Where the World’s Finest Major Appliances are Made (1952)

Haier
Manufacturing companies based in Louisville, Kentucky
Home appliance manufacturers of the United States
American companies established in 2004
Electronics companies established in 2004
2004 establishments in Kentucky
2016 mergers and acquisitions
Former General Electric subsidiaries
American subsidiaries of foreign companies